Parliamentary elections were held in Crimea on 27 March 1994. The result was a victory for Bloc Russia, which won 57 of the 100 seats in the Supreme Council.

Results

References

Crimea
Elections in Crimea